Filip Souček (born 18 September 2000) is a Czech footballer who plays as a midfielder for Zbrojovka Brno on loan from Sparta Prague.

Career
Souček began his career playing youth football for Hlučín, before moving to Opava. On 11 May 2019, Souček made his debut for Opava, coming on as an 84th-minute substitute in a 3–2 win against Dukla Prague.

On 11 February 2020, Sparta Prague signed Souček for a fee of 15 million Kč, loaning him back to Opava for the remainder of the 2019–20 season.

On 5 August 2022, Souček joined Zbrojovka Brno on a one-year loan.

Career statistics

Club

References

2000 births
Living people
People from Opava District
Czech footballers
Association football midfielders
SFC Opava players
AC Sparta Prague players
Czech First League players
Czech National Football League players
Sportspeople from the Moravian-Silesian Region
FC Zbrojovka Brno players